Oribacterium asaccharolyticum is a Gram-positive, strictly anaerobic, non-spore-forming, rod-shaped and motile bacterium from the genus of Oribacterium which has been isolated from the human subgingival dental plaque from a patient in Boston in the United States.

References 

Lachnospiraceae
Bacteria described in 2014